Steve Strachan may refer to:

Steve Strachan (sheriff) (born 1965), American law enforcement officer and politician
Steve Strachan (American football) (born 1963), American football running back